Megacyllene murina is a species of beetle in the family Cerambycidae. It was described by Hermann Burmeister in 1879.

References

Megacyllene
Beetles described in 1879